John Astudillo is the former head men's soccer coach at the State University of New York at Buffalo (UB). He held that position from 1989 to 2010 and has posted a 190-173-35 record at the helm. With 190 career victories, he is the school's all-time winningest coach. He led the 2006 Buffalo soccer team to the biggest turnaround in NCAA Division 1 soccer history winning 13 more games than the previous season. The Bulls reached the national rankings for the first time in school history, reaching a national-best 20th.

Education and playing career
A graduate of Buffalo State College with a master's degree in education, Astudillo played at the college level for coach Fred Hartrick before going on to play semi-pro for the Fort Erie Stokers of the Ontario Provincial League. A holder of an NSCAA Advanced National Coaching Diploma, Astudillo began his coaching career in 1978 by building Williamsville North into one of the premier high school soccer programs in the area. The recipient of two High School Coach of the Year awards, Astudillo coached the Williamsville North boys team to five divisional championships, four sectional titles, and a mark of 82-14-4 during his last five years. Additionally, he led Williamsville North on three occasions to the quarterfinals of the New York State Public High School Athletic Association Tournament.

Records and first
On September 9, 2001, following a 4–0 victory over Siena, Astudillo passed Sal Esposito to become the all-time leader in career victories.

In his 13 years in the highly competitive Mid-American Conference (MAC), Astudillo has coached UB's first-ever MAC Player of the Year in any sport, 12 first-team all-conference players and 15 second-team all-conference players.

Details
Astudillo's 2007 club turned in a 10-7-2 record and made their second appearance in the MAC Championship match in three seasons, falling to Akron in overtime.

In 2006, Astudillo guided the Bulls to a 10-7-2 mark and a third consecutive trip to the MAC Tournament Semifinals. Under Astudillo's guidance, two members of that team, seniors Sola Abolaji and Andrae Clarke, were drafted by professional soccer leagues following their UB careers.

During the 2005 season, the Bulls completed perhaps one off of the largest two-season turnarounds in Division-I soccer history. Just two seasons after going 1-12-3, UB enjoyed the best season in the program's 33-year history by going 14-3-2, including being the first team in Division-I soccer to win 10 games, going 10-1-0 in its first 11 games. As a result of their early success, the Bulls received their first Division-I national ranking in school history, being named 20th according to the NSCAA/Adidas rankings. As a third-seed in the MAC Tournament, the Bulls handed loses to both sixth-seeded IPFW and second-seeded Northern Illinois before taking top-seeded and nationally third-ranked Akron into double overtime, falling 7–6 in a final shootout.

In the 2004 season, UB finished 8-8-2, including a 6-0-1 start to the year. The Bulls upset third-seeded Northern Illinois in the MAC Tournament quarterfinals before losing in the semifinals to eventual MAC  AkrChampionon.

UB combined for a 7-21-4 record during the 2002 and 2003 seasons, bowing out in the MAC Tournament quarterfinals both seasons.

In 2001, for the third time since UB joined the MAC in 1998, Astudillo led the Bulls to a winning record. UB finished 8-7-2 overall and placed fourth in the conference. The Bulls qualified for the MAC Tournament but lost, 1–0, in a triple-overtime heartbreaker to Bowling Green in the quarterfinals.

He guided the Bulls to a 6-10-2 record and a sixth-place finish in the MAC during the 2000 campaign. UB hosted the quarterfinal and semifinal rounds of the MAC Tournament where they upset third-seeded Akron, 2-1, in the quarterfinal round before falling to Bowling Green, 1-0, in the semifinals.

Astudillo's Bulls posted a 10-7-1 overall record in 1999 and finished fifth in the MAC. Steve Butcher, who went on to play professionally for both the Buffalo Blizzard and Rochester Rhinos, received the highest individual honor from the conference as he was named MAC Player of the Year.

In the Bulls' first year competing in the MAC, 1998, UB finished with a 13-8-0 record under Astudillo. As the sixth seed in the MAC Tournament, Astudillo's team made some noise, defeating third-seeded Northern Illinois, 1-0, in overtime in the first round. In the second round of the tournament, the Bulls took the regular-season champion and nationally ranked Akron into three overtimes before falling, 3–2.

The growth for UB soccer began as soon as Astudillo was named the UB head coach in 1989 and the Bulls were competing at the Division II level. Astudillo was named the New York State Region III Coach of the Year after guiding the Bulls to a 9–9 record in his first season. He proceeded to guide the Bulls to a school-record 14 wins in 1990 and a national ranking as high as ninth. Astudillo was recognized by his peers by receiving the 1990 New York State Coach of the Year award after the Bulls finished with a 14-3-1 record.

In 1991, UB made the jump to the Division I level. In the first year playing at the NCAA's highest level, the Bulls again recorded double-digit wins, finishing with a 10-7-2 record, earning Astudillo the 1991 East Coast Conference Coach of the Year award.

UB began its affiliation with the Mid-Continent Conference in 1994 as Astudillo guided the Bulls to an 11-7-1 overall record, and captured the Mid-Continent East Division crown with a 5-0-1 conference mark. Astudillo was recognized for his squad's outstanding season by receiving both UB's Coach of the Year award and the Mid-Con's Coach of the Year award.

References

External links
https://web.archive.org/web/20110929083526/http://www.buffalobulls.com/sports/msoc/coaches/astudillo_john

Buffalo Bulls men's soccer coaches
Living people
Year of birth missing (living people)
Buffalo State Bengals men's soccer players
Place of birth missing (living people)
American soccer coaches
High school soccer coaches in the United States
Association footballers not categorized by position
Association football players not categorized by nationality